WRST-FM (90.3 FM) licensed to Oshkosh, Wisconsin, is the student managed radio station located at the University of Wisconsin–Oshkosh.

History 

WRST started programming on April 20, 1966 at 6pm. Originally located at 88.1FM with 10 watts of power, WRST was only on the air for four hours each weeknight. The first song played on WRST was The Mamas & the Papas "Monday, Monday". Doctor Robert "Doc" Snyder was hired by the University of Wisconsin–Oshkosh in 1964 to start a broadcast media program and as part of his duties he established a radio and TV station (Titan TV).  In 1966, Frank G. Kilpatrick moved from California to be the UW-O manager of the station as well as teach Radio Broadcasting to the students.  He had been Vice President of KXRX in San Jose.

WRST's call letters stand for "Radio Station of the Titans". However, some rumors around campus suggest that the call letters stand for "Robert Snyder's Toy", after the stations creator. Originally the call letters were supposed to be WSUO "Wisconsin State University Oshkosh" to be consistent with other state university radio stations, but those call letters were already taken and WRST was chosen.

The Fuller Goodman Lumber Company served as the station's first studios. An antenna was located on the roof of the Gruenhagen Conference Center. In 1971, production and transmission was moved to the Arts and Communication center and in the fall of 1973 the signal frequency changed from 88.1 FM to 90.3 FM and the signal strength increased from 10 to 960 watts.  

In 1992, Director of Radio Services Ben Jarman established an affiliation with the Wisconsin Public Radio Ideas Network. This was done to cover programming during the hours students are in class and over breaks from the academic year when staffing became a problem at WRST. The affiliation continues to this date.

On April 5, 2005, at 2:08pm WRST began streaming locally produced programming online. The original stream and streaming server were set up by Joshua Werner.

In 2006, WRST celebrated its 40th anniversary with a week of celebration. Also in 2006 WRST completed a studio demolition and remodel to make the studios fully ADA compliant.

Future plans are to bring more studio equipment up to date in the production studios, to add automation software to better train students for work at other stations and to add an IBOC digital radio transmitter to start broadcasting in high definition.

About WRST 

Students at WRST are responsible for most management aspects of the station and fully staff it. Professional supervision is provided by the director of radio services and director of engineering, who provide legal and technical guidance to the students.

Programming from WRST is shared half time with Wisconsin Public Radio's "Ideas Network" which runs from 2am – 1pm daily. Student shows are on the air from 1pm – 2am and provide a wide variety of music, news and talk programming along with sports coverage of UW-Oshkosh Athletics.

Current WRST programming schedule

Since 1989, Sociology professor Dr. Gerry Grzyb, called "Dr. Christmas" on-the-air, has been hosting a yearly Christmas music program on WRST the week after the fall semester concludes in December. The "Dr. Christmas Show" is proclaimed the most diverse Christmas music program in America.

External links

RST-FM
University of Wisconsin–Oshkosh
RST-FM
Wisconsin Public Radio
NPR member stations